The 1947–48 Suffolk Royals men's ice hockey season was the 2nd season of play for the program but first under the oversight of the NCAA. The Royals represent Suffolk University and were coached by Tom Moon, in his 2nd season.

Season
Despite returning many of the players from the program's first season, Tom Moon had some difficulty in getting the team to find any traction. The biggest problem for the team was a lack of facilities; they were only able to practice 4 hours a week at most and did not have anything resembling a home venue. As a result, the offense could barely score for most of the season while the defense was porous. The only thing that seemed to keep the Royals in any of their games was the play of the goaltenders. Elliot Schafer was the best player for the opening match against Tufts while George Adams, the understudy, had a marvelous performance versus Bowdoin by making 75 saves.

It's unclear how many games the team managed to play as the school's records cease after the match with Bowdoin.

Roster

Standings

Schedule and results

|-
!colspan=12 style="color:white; background:#002E5D; " | Regular Season

References 

Suffolk
Suffolk
Suffolk
Suffolk
Suffolk